The 44th Merwara Infantry was an infantry regiment of the British Indian Army. They could trace their origins to 1824, when the Sylhet Light Infantry was raised. This first 44th eventually became the 44th Gurkhas and later 8th Gurkha Rifles.

The Mhairwara Local Battalion became a civil unit in 1861, but returned to a military role as the Mhairwara Battalion in 1871. It became the 44th Merwara Infantry in 1903, after the Kitchener reforms of the Indian Army. During World War I the regiment was part of the 12th Indian Division and took part in the Battle of Shaiba, the Battle of Khafajiya and the Battle of Nasiriya in the Mesopotamia Campaign.

Further reforms of the army were undertaken after World War I and nine single battalion regiments were disbanded. Being one of the nine, the 44th Merwara Infantry were disbanded on 20 June 1921.

Previous names
The Mhairwara Local Battalion - 1822
14th (Mhairwara) Local Battalion - 1823
9th (Mhairwara) Local Battalion - 1826
The Mhairwara Battalion - 1843
The Ajmer and Mhairwara Police Corps - 1861
The Mhairwara Battalion - 1871
44th Merwara Infantry - 1903

References

Quarterly Indian Army List January 1919.  Army Headquarters India. Calcutta, 1919.

British Indian Army infantry regiments
Military units and formations established in 1824
Bengal Presidency
Military units and formations disestablished in 1921
1824 establishments in British India